Phillip Madinga is the managing director and chief executive officer for Standard Bank Malawi Limited. He was appointed to the role of chief executive officer on 1 January 2021.

Education 
He studied for his bachelor's degree in economics at the University of Malawi Chancellor College, and acquired both his  Bachelor of Business Administration and Master of Business Administration at Stellenbosch University.

Career 
On 10 February 2016 Phillip was appointed as First Merchant Bank General manager and in 2017 he was appointed Head of corporate and Investment banking at NBS Bank. Phillip also served as chairperson of the Sunbird Tourism and Commissioner for the National Planning Commission.

References

Living people
University of Malawi alumni
Stellenbosch University alumni
1971 births